The Kashe River is a  long river in Nantou County, central Taiwan. It is a tributary of the Zhuoshui River.

See also
List of rivers in Taiwan

References

Rivers of Taiwan
Landforms of Nantou County